Atigun Gorge is a valley located along the Atigun River, 2 miles east of Galbraith Lake in northern Alaska. It was first named in 1971.

It is an important travel corridor for wildlife within the Arctic National Wildlife Refuge, and is specifically valuable to Dall sheep. It is also a popular hiking destination.

References

Valleys of Alaska